Doromu, or Doromu-Koki, is a Manubaran language spoken in the "Bird's Tail" of Papua New Guinea. Doromu has about 1,500 native speakers with half of them living in the capital, Port Moresby. It has three varieties: Koki, Kokila and Koriko.

Phonology 

Doromu has 17 phonemes: 12 are consonants and 5 are vowels.

Consonants 
Below is a chart of Doromu consonants.

Vowels 
Below is a chart of Doromu vowels.

Orthography 

From March 18 to March 25 of 2002 in Kasonomu village the current orthography was developed during the Doromu Alphabet Design Workshop. The orthography developed from this workshop were discussed with various areas in the language group and were agreed upon. One problem was how borrowed words with letters not contained in the Doromu orthography would be dealt with. The proposed solution from the native speakers was to spell the loan words as they are spelled in their original language.

Verbs 
In Doromu verbs may have suffixes, which affect tense, aspect, mood, or switch reference.

Tense affixes 
Past Tense
First person singular is indicated by -(y)aka
Second and Third person singular are indicated by -(y)o
First person plural is indicated by -(y)afa
Second and Third person plural are indicated by -(y)adi

Present Tense
First person singular is indicated by -da
Second person singular is indicated by -sa
Third person singular is indicated by -do
First person plural is indicated by -sifa
Second and Third person plural are indicated by -dedi

Past Tense
First person singular is indicated by -gida
Second person singular is indicated by -giya
Third person singular is indicated by -go
First person plural is indicated by -gifa
Second and Third person plural are indicated by -gedi

Colors 

Below is a table of the names of different colors in Doromu.

The words 'blu' and 'braun' are borrowed from another language. The word 'kaka' can also mean ripe. While 'vegu' is also a noun which means 'life'. 'Kamaidaforo' is the word meaning 'colorful, attractive, glittery, sparkling'.

Numbers

References

Further reading 
 Bradshaw, Robert L. (2012). Doromu-Koki Grammar Sketch. Data Papers on Papua New Guinea Languages 58. Ukarumpa, Papua New Guinea: Summer Institute of Lingusitics.

Manubaran languages
Languages of Central Province (Papua New Guinea)